Lachlan Thomas Sharp (born 2 July 1997) is an Australian field hockey player who plays as a midfielder or forward for the Australian national team.

Career
Sharp was born in Lithgow, New South Wales, and made his senior international debut at the 2016-17 Hockey World League Final in Bhubaneswar, India.

Sharp was part of the Australian men's junior national team 'The Burras' at the 2016 Hockey Junior World Cup in India, where the team finished 4th.

In March 2018, Sharp was selected in the Australian national squad for the 2018 Commonwealth Games. The team won the gold medal, defeating New Zealand 2–0 in the final.

Sharp was selected in the Kookaburras Olympics squad for the Tokyo 2020 Olympics. The team reached the final for the first time since 2004 but couldn't achieve gold, beaten by Belgium in a shootout.

References

External links
 
 
 

1997 births
Living people
Sportsmen from New South Wales
Australian male field hockey players
Male field hockey midfielders
Male field hockey forwards
Field hockey players at the 2018 Commonwealth Games
Commonwealth Games medallists in field hockey
Commonwealth Games gold medallists for Australia
Field hockey players at the 2020 Summer Olympics
Olympic field hockey players of Australia
Olympic silver medalists for Australia
Medalists at the 2020 Summer Olympics
Olympic medalists in field hockey
Australian expatriate sportspeople in the Netherlands
Expatriate field hockey players
2023 Men's FIH Hockey World Cup players
Medallists at the 2018 Commonwealth Games